November Criminals may refer to:

 November criminals, a description by advocates of the stab-in-the-back myth of German government leaders who signed the Armistice in 1918
 The November Criminals, a 2010 novel by Sam Munson 
 November Criminals (film), a 2017 American crime drama